Paul Anthony Dempsey (born 25 May 1976) is an Australian musician. He is best known as the lead singer, guitarist and principal lyricist of rock group Something for Kate. Dempsey released his debut solo album, Everything Is True, on 20 August 2009, which peaked at No. 5 on the ARIA Albums Chart. He has also produced and co-written albums for other artists, including Mosman Alder.

Dempsey has experienced bouts of clinical depression and periods of writer's block, both of which have been publicised. Australian musicologist Ian McFarlane noted that he "has the capacity to lay his soul bare through his music, there is little pretence or adherence to fashionable measures in the band's delivery". In 2006, Dempsey married Something for Kate's bass guitarist Stephanie Ashworth (formerly of Sandpit).

Early years
Dempsey was born on 25 May 1976 and grew up in Melbourne. His father, Charlie Dempsey (born 7 November 1937), and mother, Gillian (née Barrington, born 25 May 1944), were recent Irish immigrants. Charlie died in a car accident when Dempsey was one year old and "too young to remember". He and his three older sisters, including Gillian "Jill" (born 1964) and Moira (born 1967), were raised by his mother and grandmother.

After initially learning piano from his grandmother, Dempsey switched to guitar when he was eight, and later taught himself to play drums. For his final years of secondary schooling he attended Padua College on the Mornington Peninsula, where he was interested in playing basketball.

Musical career

1994–2007: Something for Kate

In mid-1994, six months after leaving Padua College, Dempsey, on lead guitar and lead vocals, formed Something for Kate in Melbourne, Australia, with school friend Clint Hyndman on drums. They soon recruited Julian Carroll to play bass guitar by advertising in local record stores.

Initially named Fish of the Day, the group were renamed after a gig at the Punter's Club, with Dempsey's Jack Russell dog, Kate, serving as the key inspiration. They played two shows before they released a demo tape in 1995. In early 1996, they were signed to the Sony subsidiary label Murmur Records by A&R representative Chris Dunn—all of the members were 19 years old at the time. From 1996 to 2007, the band released five studio albums, four of which peaked within the ARIA top 10. In 2007, the band announced they were on a hiatus.

2008–2011: Solo Career and Everything Is True
In 2007, Dempsey began writing material for his debut solo album. By 2009, he had commenced recording an album titled Everything Is True in Los Angeles with mix engineer-producer Doug Boehm—in April 2009, the process was complete. The first single, "Out the Airlock", was briefly offered as a free download on his website before being officially released on 15 May 2009. The album was released on 14 August 2009 and peaked at No. 5 on the ARIA Album Chart. At the ARIA Music Awards of 2009, Dempsey and the album were nominated for three ARIA Awards: ARIA Award for Best Male Artist, ARIA Award for Best Adult Contemporary Album and ARIA Award for Producer of the Year.

Following the release of his solo album, Dempsey and Ashworth relocated to New York, US, for two years in 2010. While in the US, Dempsey formed a backing band but also performed solo shows; in a June 2013 interview, Dempsey explained: "In our two years in New York I think I played more shows in that two years than I had in the previous 10. I felt like I was being what I regard as a working musician, actually going out and playing music every night or several nights a week. As someone who's been doing it for nearly 20 years, I think it is important to put yourself in situations where you feel like you're doing it for the first time and you still have something to prove to an audience and—most importantly—to yourself."

Dempsey released a solo album of cover versions called Shotgun Karaoke, which was released on 4 October 2013 and peaked at No. 17 on the ARIA Album Chart.

2012–present: Something for Kate and solo work
In September 2012, the sixth Something for Kate studio album, Leave Your Soul to Science, was released and debuted at No. 5 on the ARIA Album Chart. The band commenced a national Australian tour in support of the album in June 2013. Dempsey revealed his ongoing enthusiasm for live performance prior to the tour: "I enjoy getting out and playing more than ever. I get more impatient and frustrated that I can't do it more often."

Dempsey released a second solo album called Shotgun Karaoke, which was released on 4 October 2013 and peaked at No. 17 on the ARIA Album Chart.

In regard to the changes that the internet has had on the music industry, Dempsey said in November 2014: "A ton of things have changed and a ton of things haven't changed. I think the only brand new hurdle is that most music is now simply there for the taking and a large proportion of the population seem disinclined to assign any value at all to the hard work and resources that went into creating it. Other than that, the only thing that matters is the only thing that's ever mattered (in my opinion) and that is getting out there and playing your arse off in front of people anywhere you can, anytime you can. It's better than radio, it's better than the internet, it's better than a review and it's better for you and your band. If you want to be a musician, go be a musician. Be prepared to lose money and play to no one [but] hopefully it'll get better as you get better."

Other projects
In late 1997, Dempsey filled in as a guitarist for Brisbane band Fur, and Perth-based band Ammonia. He also played drums for two Bluebottle Kiss shows and for his sister's band, John Smith.

In 1998, he recorded an album of songs that he had written for a side project with other musicians called Scared of Horses.

In 2003, he produced and played drums, bass, guitar and keyboards on The Givegoods' 2003 album, I Want to Kill a Rich Man. The Givegoods was the project of Tom Morgan (Smudge) and Andy Calvert, with assistance from Evan Dando (The Lemonheads) and Juanita Stein (Waikiki and Howling Bells).

Between 2006 and 2010, Dempsey produced the album The Gleaner for Melbourne singer-songwriter Brendan Welch.

In October 2009 at the Melbourne International Arts Festival, Dempsey performed in the world premiere of the musical theatre production of Dirtsong, created by Black Arm Band. The songs were written by Alexis Wright, with some sung in Indigenous languages. The show was reprised as the closing show at the 2014 Adelaide Festival. Other performers included Trevor Jamieson (2014 only), Archie Roach, Lou Bennett, Jimmy Barnes, and Emma Donovan.

In 2010, Dempsey played a variety of instruments on several of Melbourne dance artist T-Rek's albums, and contributed keyboards on Melbourne band The Nation Blue's album Protest Songs. In April 2010, Dempsey produced and mixed the third studio EP, Heavy Harm, by Sydney rock band, Papa VS Pretty.

In October 2011, Dempsey performed with the Black Arm Band, Archie Roach, Mavis Staples, Ricki Lee Jones, and Joss Stone in "Notes From the Hard Road and Beyond", which was part of the Melbourne Festival and was held at The Sidney Myer Music Bowl. Dempsey played guitar and performed a duet with Stone, sang with Staples, and performed a rendition of "A Hard Rain's A-Gonna Fall" with Australian singer-songwriter Shane Howard.

In January 2014, Dempsey produced the debut album, Humdrum Star, for six-piece Brisbane band Mosman Alder. The album was released on Dew Process Records.

In late 2014, Dempsey commenced production work on a new album for Mike Noga, former drummer of The Drones. Based on the experiences of fellow musicians like Davey Lane (You Am I), Noga launched a Pozible campaign to pay for the anticipated recording costs of A$16,000. Noga explained seven days prior to the close of the campaign in late November 2014 that he asked Dempsey to produce the album:"Paul and I have been friends for many years now and we've discovered that we work pretty damn well together. I'm somewhat 'loose' when it comes to songwriting and he is the exact opposite, so put us together in a room and it all evens out quite nicely. He also knows a hell of a lot about recording equipment which I profess to know absolutely nothing about ... He hears things others don't."

Television
Dempsey appeared as a panellist on RocKwiz on 24 February 2007, performing a solo version of "Monsters" and George Michael's "Careless Whisper" with Kate Miller-Heidke. He also appeared on Good News Week on 26 October 2009, performing the song "Fire" by Bruce Springsteen as part of the "Strange But True" segment.
Dempsey appeared on RocKwiz again on 8 June. He performed a solo version of "Survival Expert" from Something for Kate's album Leave Your Soul to Science as well as Hall & Oates "Out of Touch" with Emily Lubitz.

Personal life

Dempsey has suffered bouts of clinical depression and has also complained about periods of writer's block. In a 2010 interview he explained:

In 2005, Dempsey married bandmate and long-term domestic partner Stephanie Ashworth in Las Vegas, Nevada. They are parents to a son, Miller, who was born in May 2011. In 2010, the couple had relocated to New York City, for two years, and Dempsey revealed his intention to return to the American city in a June 2013 interview.

In a November 2014 interview conducted by Mosman Alder, Dempsey replied to a question about whether he believes in the possibility of a soul or an afterlife by saying: "No more than I believe in the 'possibility' of a tooth fairy"; the interviewer described him as "a man of science and a sinful heathen-atheist". Later in the interview, Dempsey said that he is a fan of the astrophysicist Neil deGrasse Tyson, whose writings he has read, and whom he has seen in a live discussion with Brian Greene that was held in New York City.

In November 2014, Dempsey said that his all-time favorite band is Fugazi.

Discography

Studio albums

Extended plays

Singles

Awards and nominations

APRA Awards
The APRA Awards are presented annually from 1982 by the Australasian Performing Right Association (APRA), "honouring composers and songwriters".

! 
|-
| 2002
| "Monsters" by Something for Kate (Paul Dempsey, Stephanie Ashworth, Clint Hyndman)
| Song of the Year
| 
|
|-
| 2020 
| "Fear Of Missing Out" by Ainslie Wills (Ainslie Wills, Paul Dempsey, Lawrence Folvig, Arron Light)
| Song of the Year
| 
| 
|-
| 2021 
| "Situation Room by Something for Kate (Paul Dempsey, Stephanie Ashworth, Clint Hyndman)
| Song of the Year
| 
| 
|-

National Live Music Awards
The National Live Music Awards (NLMAs) are a broad recognition of Australia's diverse live industry, celebrating the success of the Australian live scene. The awards commenced in 2016.

|-
| rowspan="2" | National Live Music Awards of 2016
| rowspan="2" | himself 
| Live Voice of the Year
| 
|-
| Victorian Live Voice of the Year
| 
|-

EG Awards/Music Victoria Awards
The Music Victoria Awards (previously known as The Age EG Awards and The Age Music Victoria Awards) are an annual awards night celebrating Victorian music.

|-
| rowspan="2" | EG Awards of 2009
| himself
| Best Male Artist
| unknown
|-
| Everything Is True
| Best Album
| unknown
|-

References

General
  Note: Archived [on-line] copy has limited functionality.
Specific

1976 births
21st-century Australian singers
21st-century Australian male singers
Living people
People educated at Padua College (Melbourne)
Something for Kate members
Musicians from Melbourne